Julio Bazan is an Argentine journalist who works for the Clarín newspaper and its cable channel, TN "Todo Noticias".

Award Nomination
 2013 Martín Fierro Awards- Best news reporter

References

1946 births
Living people
People from Buenos Aires
Argentine people of Paraguayan descent
Argentine journalists
Male journalists